Australomisidia is a genus of spiders in the family Thomisidae. It was first described in 2014 by Szymkowiak. , it contains 8 species, all from Australia.

Species
Australomisidia comprises the following species:
Australomisidia cruentata (L. Koch, 1874)
Australomisidia elegans (L. Koch, 1876)
Australomisidia ergandros (Evans, 1995)
Australomisidia inornata (L. Koch, 1876)
Australomisidia kangarooblaszaki (Szymkowiak, 2008)
Australomisidia pilula (L. Koch, 1867)
Australomisidia rosea (L. Koch, 1875)
Australomisidia socialis (Main, 1988)

References

Thomisidae
Araneomorphae genera
Spiders of Australia